Angmering is a village and civil parish between Littlehampton and Worthing in West Sussex on the southern edge of the South Downs National Park, England; about two-thirds of the parish (mostly north of the A27 road) fall within the  Park. It has been inhabited since the Bronze Age and there are the remains of a Roman Villa and bath house. In 1976, Angmering was twinned with the Normandy town of Ouistreham on the "Riva-Bella", the location of the World War II Normandy Landings' Sword Beach.

Angmering railway station is  mile from the village centre straddling the boundaries of Angmering and East Preston.

In the "Dad's Army" episode, "Turkey Dinner" (S7, Ep. 6), Lance Corporal Jones, in reference to his mother, says that she's "gone to another place. Angmering!"

Etymology
The name "Angmering" probably derives from a Saxon farming settlement of about 650AD. It is thought that the original name was "Angenmaering" meaning Angenmaer's people. Various name changes took place over the centuries and these included Angemeringatun, Angmerengatum, Angemaeringum, Angemeringe, Aingmarying, Angmarrying, Angemare and Ameringe. Towards the end of the 9th century Alfred the Great, King of Wessex, bequeathed to his kinsman Osferthe ‘... Angmerengatum and the land that thereto longyth’.

History
A large Roman villa was discovered nearby and part-excavated in the 1930s. The excavation was mainly centred on a large bath house complex comprising at least eight rooms. It may have been occupied by an important Roman citizen or a member of the Romano-British aristocracy, like the palace at Fishbourne, and dates from the same period of 65-75AD.

Demography
With the recent development of the Bramley Green site, an influx of new residents has brought Angmering's electoral ward's resident population at the 2011 census to 7,788. In 2001 the population was 5,639, illustrating the 38.1 per cent increase in the village's population over the last decade or so. By 2023, the population had grown to about 10,100.

Ethnicity
According to the Office for National Statistics based on the 2011 census 97.6 per cent of the 7,788 population of Angmering were White with 94.3 per cent being White British, 0.7 per cent White Irish and 2.6 per cent identifying as White Other. 2.4 percent of Angmering's residents are from a Black or Minority Ethnic Background.

Religion
According to the 2011 Census, the largest religious grouping is Christians (66 per cent), followed by those of no religion (25.2 per cent). Angmering has a 12th-century Anglican church, St Margaret's (re-built by Samuel Sanders Teulon in 1852 and reordered in 2009), a small Catholic congregation centred on St Wilfred's Catholic Primary School, and a Baptist church.

Geography
The parish is about seven miles (10 km) long (from north to south) and two miles (3  km) wide. Its roots stretch back to the Bronze Age and it is also the site of a substantial Roman Villa.

At the top of Angmering is Highdown Hill, a National Trust property with free access for walks and picnics on the smooth grass near the still-visible slopes of a former chalk quarry.

The village has three schools, several small shops, a post office and many historic houses from the 15th century onwards. It is in a semi-rural area with many farms. Following the building of the Bramley Green development, Angmering is the most populous settlement in the Arundel and South Downs (UK Parliament constituency).

Sport
Angmering is home to the Oval Raceway or Angmering Motor Sports Centre. Worthing Rugby Football Club, a national level professional rugby club, occupies extensive grounds in the east of the village. Angmering Football Club play their home games at the Recreation Field in Decoy Drive. They play in the West Sussex Football League.

Notable inhabitants
The village was the birthplace of Tom Oliver, who, after adding an l to his name to become Olliver, became the winning rider of the 1842, 1843 and 1853 Grand Nationals. Impresario Lord Bernard Delfont and record producer Norman Newell have lived in Angmering.  The actor and singer Stanley Holloway lived in the parish of East Preston (Angmering-on-Sea) with his wife before his death in 1982.

Portrait artist Juliet Pannett and her family lived in Angmering from the mid-1960s.

Twinning
Since 1976, Angmering has been twinned with the coastal French town of Ouistreham in the Calvados department of Normandy.
  Ouistreham, France

Notes

Sources

External links

Angmering Village Life contains extensive village history, local news, organisations, traders, photos, videos, forums, etc.

Angmering Project has all of Angmering census returns and surrounding villages available to view.
Further historical information and sources on GENUKI

Arun District
Villages in West Sussex